Extraliga is the premier futsal league in Slovakia.  It was founded in 1993. Organized by Slovak Football Association and is played under UEFA and FIFA rules, currently consists of 10 teams.

2010–11 season

Champions

External links
futsalplanet.com

Futsal competitions in Slovakia
futsal
Slovakia
Sports leagues established in 1993
1993 establishments in Slovakia